John Alexander Fraser (December 19, 1881 – May 8, 1959) was a Canadian amateur soccer player who competed in the 1904 Summer Olympics. Fraser was born in Hamilton, Ontario. In 1904 he was member of the Galt F.C. team, which won the gold medal in the soccer tournament. He played one match as a midfielder.

References

External links
profile 

1881 births
1959 deaths
Canadian soccer players
Canadian people of Scottish descent
Association football midfielders
Footballers at the 1904 Summer Olympics
Olympic gold medalists for Canada
Olympic soccer players of Canada
Soccer players from Hamilton, Ontario
Olympic medalists in football
Medalists at the 1904 Summer Olympics